Tom Soehn (born April 15, 1966) is an American soccer coach who is the head coach of USL Championship club Birmingham Legion. A former player, his career as a defender spanned seven clubs across 12 seasons, both indoors and outdoors.

Playing career

Youth and college
Soehn was born to immigrant parents. His parents moved to the United States from Germany, but his father was born in Romania. Soehn began playing soccer with the Chicago Kickers when he was four.  He attended Forest View High School.  He attended Western Illinois University from 1984 to 1987.  In 2003, Western Illinois inducted Soehn into its Athletics Hall of Fame.

Indoor soccer
Soehn signed with the Wichita Wings of Major Indoor Soccer League from 1988 to 1992.  He moved to the Denver Thunder of the National Professional Soccer League (NPSL) for the 1992–1993 season before returning to the Wings in 1993 which were now playing in the NPSL.  He remained with the Wings until 1996.  In 1995, he played the summer indoor season with the Las Vegas Dustdevils of the Continental Indoor Soccer League (CISL).

CSL
In 1989 and 1990, Soehn played with the Ottawa Intrepid of the Canadian Soccer League (CSL). In 1991, he played with the Hamilton Steelers.

APSL
In addition to playing indoor soccer, Soehn played with the Colorado Foxes of the American Professional Soccer League (APSL) in 1992, 1993 and 1994.  The Foxes went to three consecutive APSL championship games those three seasons.  They won the 1992 and 1993 titles, but lost to the Montreal Impact in 1994.

MLS
Soehn played four years in MLS after being drafted by the Dallas Burn in the second round of the 1996 MLS Inaugural Player Draft.  He missed the 1996 season with the injury, but played for the Burn in 1997.  In 1998, he began the season with the Burn, but was traded to the Chicago Fire after fourteen games.  He remained with the Fire until he retired from playing in 2000.  During his time with Chicago, he was a member of the Fire's three championship teams (MLS Cup 1998, U.S. Open Cup 1998 and 2000).

Coaching career
After retiring as a player, he became an assistant coach to Bob Bradley at the Fire and then moved to D.C. United to become Peter Nowak's top assistant in 2003.  During his time as the top assistant, D.C. United won MLS Cup in 2004, and a Supporters Shield in 2005.  On December 21, 2006, Soehn replaced Nowak as the head coach at United. While working for D.C. United, Soehn and his family lived in Ashburn, Virginia.

On November 3, 2009, it was announced that Soehn had withdrawn himself for consideration for a contract renewal, ending a three-year reign that included a Supporters Shield in 2007, an Open Cup in 2008 and Open Cup Runner-Up in 2009.

On January 19, 2010, Soehn was given the job as Director of Soccer Operations by Canadian soccer club Vancouver Whitecaps FC. On May 30, 2011 it was announced that he would take over as head coach of the Vancouver Whitecaps, after Teitur Thordarson was let go by the club.  After the 2011 season ended, Soehn stepped down from the head coaching role in favor for Martin Rennie and reclaimed his former position as Director of Soccer Operations.

On November 15, 2012, it was revealed that Soehn and Vancouver Whitecaps FC had mutually parted ways.

As of January 10, 2014, Soehn has been brought to the New England Revolution as an assistant coach to Jay Heaps.

On September 18, 2017, it was reported that Jay Heaps had been fired and that Soehn would take over as the interim coach of the New England Revolution.

On August 16, 2018, the newly-formed Birmingham Legion FC announced that Soehn would become head coach of the team ahead of their first season in the USL.

Managerial statistics

References

External links
 NPSL stats
 
 D.C. United profile

1966 births
Living people
American soccer players
American expatriate soccer players
American soccer coaches
American Professional Soccer League players
American people of German-Romanian descent
American people of German descent
Canadian Soccer League (1987–1992) players
Expatriate soccer players in Canada
American expatriate sportspeople in Canada
Ottawa Intrepid players
Colorado Foxes players
Major Indoor Soccer League (1978–1992) players
Wichita Wings (MISL) players
National Professional Soccer League (1984–2001) players
Denver Thunder players
Continental Indoor Soccer League players
Las Vegas Dustdevils players
Major League Soccer players
FC Dallas players
Chicago Fire FC players
D.C. United coaches
Vancouver Whitecaps FC coaches
Western Illinois Leathernecks men's soccer players
D.C. United non-playing staff
People from Ashburn, Virginia
New England Revolution non-playing staff
Chicago Fire FC non-playing staff
Association football defenders
Birmingham Legion FC
USL Championship coaches
Hamilton Steelers (1981–1992) players